Extremely Dangerous is a 1999 four-part drama serial for ITV starring Sean Bean.

Synopsis
Neil Byrne, an ex-National Criminal Intelligence Service undercover agent convicted of the brutal murder of his wife and child who goes on the run to try and clear his name. He sets out to follow up a strange clue sent to him in prison. The boss of a local crime syndicate, a former associate, hears of his escape and sends out the word to bring him in. On the run from the police and disowned by his NCIS colleagues, he is faced with the fact that he may be guilty.

Cast 
Sean Bean as Neil Byrne
Juliet Aubrey as Annie
Antony Booth as Frank Palmer
Ralph Brown as Joe Connor
Sean Gallagher as DI Danny Ford
Alex Norton as DCS Wallace

External links

1999 British television series debuts
1999 British television series endings
1990s British drama television series
British thriller television series
ITV television dramas
Television series by ITV Studios
1990s British television miniseries
English-language television shows
Television shows set in Hertfordshire